Prem Raja Mahat is a Nepalese folk singer. He has sung songs like Bajho Khet Ma, Paan Ko Paat, Balla Paryo Nirmaya, and Simsime Panima, which are considered timeless Nepali classics. He is also renowned for playing sarangi, a traditional instrument from Nepal used primarily in folk music.

Along with another well-known artist in Nepali folk music, Bam Bahadur Karki, he sang Khola Pari Nirmaya, Music Nepal's first folk song which was released in 1986. Additionally, he has sung for Nepali feature films, such as Paat Bajaune Mayalai for the 2005 film Muglan. Due to his prominence in Nepali music, he is often compared to well-known artists like Elvis Presley in the western world.

Personal life 
Prem Raja Mahat immigrated to the United States in 1996, when he was 33 years old. Later, in 2001, his family joined him in the States. He currently runs a Nepali restaurant in Baltimore. He continued to contribute new Nepali folk music after relocating to the States, such as the well-liked 2021 song Maya Bandipuraima.

Mahat is skilled in playing sarangi, madal, and harmonium, the first two of which are indigenous Nepalese instruments.

Musical career 
Mahat first sang for the radio in 1978, and his first song was also recorded in the same year. His first song was Tara Khaseko, which was a hit of its time. His songs gained immense popularity in the late 1980s and the 1990s; since then he has been active in Nepali folk music. Because of his contribution towards Nepali folk music, he has earned recognition among the Nepali people.

Selected discography 
Mahat has released over 59 albums, and many singles. Only a small number of his albums are represented in the list below.

 Aakasaima Joon
 Hiunchuli Ma Hiun
 Mutu Ko Dhadkan
 Gaaumai Ramailo
 Phool Phulyo Sanhila
 Mayale Taana Rasile
 Bajho Khetma
 Panko Paat, Vol. 1
 Sannani
 Simsime Panima
 Salaiko Paataile
 Phool Fulyo Sahila
 Dautari
 Chari Himalma
 Trisulima Bhel

See also 

 Dohori
 Music of Nepal

References

Bibliography

External links 

 Prem Raja Mahat on YouTube
 Prem Raja Mahat on NPR
 Prem Raja Mahat on SBS
 Prem Raja Mahat on Music Nepal

Living people
20th-century Nepalese male singers
Nepalese folk musicians
Khas people
Dohori singers
People from Tanahun District
Nepali-language singers
Nepalese playback singers
Year of birth missing (living people)